Upper Sister Lake is a lake located northwest of the hamlet of Raquette Lake, New York. Fish species present in the lake are brook trout, yellow perch, and black bullhead. No motors are allowed on this lake.

References

Lakes of Hamilton County, New York
Lakes of New York (state)